Howard Jeffrey Rose (born February 13, 1954) is an American sportscaster. He is currently a radio broadcaster for the New York Mets on WCBS. Previously, Rose called play-by-play for the New York Rangers and New York Islanders.

Early life
Rose was born in the New York City borough of Brooklyn to a Jewish family. Rose's father, an avid New York Yankees fan, encouraged his baseball fandom. When the New York Mets moved into Shea Stadium in 1964, Rose became a regular attendee at games. He attended PS 205Q (The Alexander Graham Bell School), Benjamin N. Cardozo High School in Bayside, Queens, and graduated from Queens College in 1977. He lives in Woodbury on Long Island with his wife and two daughters.

Career
Rose started his career doing sports updates on New York City-based Sports Phone, a telephone dial-in service, during the mid-1970s, which led to sports updates on news radio station WCBS-AM through the early 1980s.

Baseball

Rose has called Mets play-by-play on radio or television since 1995, and is regarded by fans and media outlets alike as an expert of Mets history. He has previously hosted the "Mets Extra" pre- and post-game shows. He worked the television booth until the retirement of long-time Mets radio voice Bob Murphy in 2003. The following year, Rose took Murphy's spot alongside Gary Cohen on WFAN. Cohen became the play-by-play broadcaster on then-new Mets television network SportsNet New York starting during the 2006 season, sharing the radio booth with partner Tom McCarthy. In 2008, Wayne Hagin replaced McCarthy, and from 2012-2018, Rose called games with Josh Lewin. As of 2019, Howie calls games with Wayne Randazzo. From 2014-2018 he called games on WOR, before moving to WCBS in 2019. He has also co-hosted MLB Now, joining Brian Kenny, Mark DeRosa, and Ken Rosenthal on MLB Network.

Rose has also been the master of the ceremonies during key Mets events, including Opening Day at Shea Stadium and Citi Field since 2004. He has hosted ceremonies marking the opening of Citi Field in 2009, the 40th anniversary of the Mets 1969 World Series victory, a special pregame ceremony honoring Ralph Kiner in 2008, Mike Piazza's number retirement ceremony in 2016 and Old-Timers' Day beginning in 2022.

Hockey
Rose worked as a play-by-play radio announcer for the New York Rangers, and was paired mainly with Sal Messina. He is most recognized by Rangers fans for his call when Stéphane Matteau scored the game-winning goal in double-overtime of Game 7 of the 1994 NHL Eastern Conference Finals against the New Jersey Devils en route to the Stanley Cup Finals.

The Rangers would go on to win the cup that year over the Vancouver Canucks 4 games to 3, their first Stanley Cup victory in 54 years.

Rose was the play-by-play announcer for Islanders telecasts where he worked alongside Butch Goring. For the  season, Rose's work was simulcast on radio as well.

After the 2015-2016 season, Rose announced he would not return to call Islanders games after the end of the season.

Other career roles
Rose was the original prime-time radio host on WFAN when the station went all-sports in 1987, hosting the program until 1995. Rose occasionally worked games for Fox NHL Saturday in the mid-1990s, and now works for Fox Saturday Baseball. He has also called Long Island Blackbirds basketball and soccer.

On March 1, 2013, his book Put it in the Book was released. The book is an autobiography and memoir of 50 years of Mets history. The book was co-written with Phil Pepe.

Announcing style
Rose's end-of-game catchphrase is, "Put it in the books", used after the final out is recorded in a Mets win. After Mets losses, Rose says "and the ballgame is over".  When he uses the phrasing "and the Mets are leading by a score of _ to _", he is using the same diction as original Mets broadcaster Lindsey Nelson.

Awards
In 2012, Rose was inducted into the National Jewish Sports Hall of Fame. He has won two Emmy awards for excellence in broadcasting for the New York Islanders. In 2019, it was announced that Howie would be inducted into the New York Baseball Hall of Fame. In 2023, it was announced that Rose would be inducted into the Mets Hall of Fame.

Personal life
Rose is married to Barbara, and they have two daughters. Their daughter Alyssa has worked for the Mets organization as a social media personality, and has worked on soap operas. She appeared on the soap opera One Life to Live, had two separate podcasts, called Scoring Position and Drunk Love, and currently works for Sportsnet New York.

During the 2021 season, Rose missed time with an undisclosed medical issue, first from April 13 until the 20th, and later missing the last month of the season. In early 2023, it was revealed that Rose had been privately battling bladder cancer.

References

External links

New York Mets profile
MSG profile

1954 births
American radio sports announcers
College basketball announcers in the United States
Jewish American sportspeople
Living people
Major League Baseball broadcasters
National Basketball Association broadcasters
National Football League announcers
National Hockey League broadcasters
New Jersey Nets announcers
New York Islanders announcers
New York Mets announcers
New York Rangers announcers
New York Jets announcers
Sportspeople from Queens, New York
Benjamin N. Cardozo High School alumni
Queens College, City University of New York alumni
People from Woodbury, Nassau County, New York
21st-century American Jews
20th-century American Jews